Joseph Seaver Curtis (June 8, 1831May 15, 1878) was an American lawyer, Republican politician, and Wisconsin pioneer.  He was a member of the Wisconsin State Assembly for three terms, representing Green Bay and eastern Brown County during the 1869, 1871, and 1873 sessions.  He was also an editor of the Green Bay Gazette, and an officer in the Union Army during the American Civil War.

Early life

Joseph Seaver Curtis was born in Warren, Ohio, in June 1831.  His mother died when he was just a year old.  His father moved the family back east to Vermont, where Joseph was raised and educated.  He graduated from Williams College, in Massachusetts, in 1852.  He came out of college in poor health and sought revitalization in the west.  He moved to Green Bay, Wisconsin, where his uncle, Reverend Jeremiah Porter, was established and lived as a member of Porter's household for several years.  When the Porters left Wisconsin, in 1858, Curtis elected to stay and make it his permanent home.

In these early years in Green Bay, he served in several local offices, including justice of the peace, city clerk, and deputy clerk of the court.  He chose to study law and moved temporarily to Madison, Wisconsin, to utilize the library there.

Civil War service
While he was living in Madison, the country entered the American Civil War.  He joined up with a company of Green Bay volunteers who had come to Madison to become organized into a regiment, and was enrolled as a private in Company H of the 12th Wisconsin Infantry Regiment.

The 12th Wisconsin Infantry mustered into federal service in January 1862 and proceeded to Missouri for service in the western theater of the war. Due to logistical challenges in southern Illinois, the regiment was exposed to severe cold and food shortages for much of their journey.  Curtis served with the regiment through the Vicksburg campaign and Sherman's Atlanta campaign, he was promoted to corporal and re-enlisted at the end of his three year term as a veteran.

He refused several offers to be commissioned as an officer, until July 1864, when he accepted commission as second lieutenant of Company E in the 42nd Wisconsin Infantry Regiment.  He served only briefly with the 42nd Wisconsin Infantry, however.  He was detached from his company and served as adjutant for the mustering office at Cairo, Illinois, until the end of the war.

Political career
Curtis returned to Green Bay after the war and was admitted to the bar.  He was a staunch Republican and was elected to three non-consecutive terms (1869, 1871, 1873) in the Wisconsin State Assembly, representing Green Bay and parts of eastern Brown County.  He also ran for election to the 1872 Assembly session, but was defeated in that election.  He ran for Wisconsin State Senate twice in the 2nd Senate district, but was defeated both times, in 1869 and 1873.

Curtis was a friend and political ally to the owners of the Green Bay Gazette, and spent a year as editor of the paper in 1877.  During the 31st Wisconsin Legislature, he was appointed clerk of the Assembly committee on revision, but had to resign due to his failing health.

He died at his home in Green Bay, in May 1878, after suffering from illness for much of his adult life.

Electoral history

Wisconsin Assembly (1868, 1870, 1871, 1872)

| colspan="6" style="text-align:center;background-color: #e9e9e9;"| General Election, November 8, 1870

| colspan="6" style="text-align:center;background-color: #e9e9e9;"| General Election, November 7, 1871

| colspan="6" style="text-align:center;background-color: #e9e9e9;"| General Election, November 5, 1872

Wisconsin Senate (1869, 1873)

| colspan="6" style="text-align:center;background-color: #e9e9e9;"| General Election, November 2, 1869

| colspan="6" style="text-align:center;background-color: #e9e9e9;"| General Election, November 4, 1873

References

External links

1831 births
1878 deaths
Politicians from Green Bay, Wisconsin
Politicians from Warren, Ohio
People of Wisconsin in the American Civil War
Williams College alumni
Editors of Wisconsin newspapers
Wisconsin lawyers
Republican Party members of the Wisconsin State Assembly
19th-century American journalists
American male journalists
19th-century American male writers
19th-century American politicians
Journalists from Ohio
Writers from Green Bay, Wisconsin
19th-century American lawyers